The Football League, now English Football League, is an English professional association football league.

Football League may also refer to:

American football
 American Football League
 Arena Football League
 China Arena Football League
 Indoor Football League (1999–2000)
 Indoor Football League (2008)
 Independent Women's Football League
 Legends Football League
 National Football League
 Women's American Football League
 Women's Arena Football League
 Women's Football League
 Women's Professional Football League

Association football
 Bulgarian Professional Football League
 Croatian First Football League
 Football League (Greece)
 Highland Football League
 Japan Football League (1992–1998)
 Japan Football League
 J.League (Japan Professional Football League)
 Macedonian First Football League
 National Football League (India)
 National Football League (South Africa)
 Northern Football League
 Scottish Football League
 Scottish Professional Football League
 Southern Football League

Australian football
 Australian Football League
 South Australian National Football League
 United States Australian Football League
 Victorian Football League
 West Australian Football League

Canadian football
 Canadian Football League

Gaelic football
 Ladies' National Football League
 National Football League (Ireland)

Rugby football
 Rugby Football League

See also
 National League (disambiguation)
 Midland Football League (disambiguation)
 National Football League (disambiguation)
 Northern Football League (disambiguation)
 Professional Indoor Football League (disambiguation)
 Southern Football League (disambiguation)
 Sports league